Çanaqçı (also, Çanaxçı, Chanakhchi, Chanakhchy, and Chenakhchi) is a village and municipality in the Dashkasan Rayon of Azerbaijan. It has a population of 420.  The municipality consists of the villages of Çanaqçı and Zivlan.

References 

Populated places in Dashkasan District